Cameroon competed in the 2014 Commonwealth Games in Glasgow, Scotland from 23 July – 3 August 2014.

Medalists

Athletics

Men

Women

Combined events – Heptathlon

Judo

Men

Women

Weightlifting

Men

Women

 Powerlifting

Wrestling

Men's freestyle

Women's freestyle

References

Nations at the 2014 Commonwealth Games
Cameroon at the Commonwealth Games
2014 in Cameroonian sport